Splash is a studio album by jazz musician Freddie Hubbard released in 1981 on the Fantasy label which features performances by Hubbard with several R&B/soul session musicians.

Reception
The Allmusic biography by Scott Yanow identifies the album as one of Hubbard's "low points"  but still features some fine playing albeit not for pure jazz listeners.

Track listing
 "Splash" (David "Cat" Cohen, Thurlene Johnson) - 5:02   
 "Mystic Lady" - 4:53   
 "I'm Yours" (Clarence McDonald, Hall) - 4:51   
 "Touchdown" (Cohen, Don Tracy) - 5:08   
 "You're Gonna Lose Me" (Cynthia Faulkner, Jackie Morissette, Hall) (featuring Jeanie Tracy) - 5:20  
 "Sister 'Stine" - 5:24   
 "Jarri" - 6:34 
All compositions by Al Hall Jr. & Freddie Hubbard except as indicated

Personnel
 Freddie Hubbard - trumpet, flugelhorn, producer
 David T. Walker - guitar
 Paul Jackson Jr. - guitar
 Louis Small - keyboards
 Clarence McDonald - keyboards
 Chester Thompson - keyboards
 Ron Brown - bass
 David Shields - bass
 Jim Keltner - drums
 James Gadson - drums
 Al Hall Jr. - synthesizer, trombone, percussion, producer, arranger
 William "Buck" Clarke - percussion, conga 
 Tony Flores - percussion
 Maurice "Mo" Young - backing vocals
 Jeanie Tracy - vocals, backing vocals 
 Juan Escovedo - bongos 
 Joe Sugayan - congas, percussion

References

1981 albums
Freddie Hubbard albums
Fantasy Records albums